The Hochfelden synagogue is a Monument historique in Hochfelden, in the French departement of Bas-Rhin. The building also serves the role of a museum.

The building is located at Hochfelden's 10 and 12 Général Koenig Square.

History 
There was a synagogue nearby the site's ground during the 17th century, but it fell out of use and a new building was eventually established in 1841. The structure was renovated 1893. It became a monument historique on 10 April 1996, and has been ever since.

The Jewish community was persecuted by local authorities. On 10 January 1799 the municipal government publicly condemned the practice of attending synagogue.

The synagogue also holds a now-defunct Jewish school.

See also 

 History of the Jews in Alsace

References

External links 

 

Religious buildings and structures completed in 1841
Synagogues in France
Monuments historiques of Bas-Rhin
1841 establishments in France
Alsatian-Jewish history
Museums in Bas-Rhin